"Wonder" is a song by Natalie Merchant, released in 1995 as the second single  from her solo album Tigerlily. The single reached number 20 on the US Billboard Hot 100 and number 10 on the Canadian RPM Top Singles chart, outperforming her previous single "Carnival" in Canada. The covers for the U.S. and European singles were different. The single also includes live cuts from Merchant's tour.

Inspiration
In a BBC Mastertapes interview, Natalie said the song "... was about a child born with a congenital disease,"  twins she had known personally. It was later found out that the set of twins had epidermolysis bullosa (EB), a rare genetic condition that results in easy blistering of the skin and mucous membranes.

Track listings

US CD single
 "Wonder" (remix) – 4:24
 "Baby I Love You" – 3:44

UK cassette single
 "Wonder" (remix edit) – 4:08
 "Sympathy for the Devil" (live) – 5:17

European CD1
 "Wonder" (LP version) – 4:26
 "Baby I Love You"/"Son of a Preacher Man" (live medley) – 5:55
 "All I Want" – 3:17

European CD2
 "Wonder" (remix edit) – 4:08
 "Sympathy for the Devil" (live) – 5:17
 "Take a Look" (live) – 3:14
 "The Work Song" (live) – 3:52

European and Australian maxi-single
 "Wonder" (remix edit) – 4:08
 "Baby I Love You" – 3:44
 "All I Want" – 3:17

Charts

Weekly charts

Year-end charts

In popular culture
 The  song inspired R. J. Palacio's book of the same name, which was turned into  a 2017 film starring Julia Roberts. The song was included in the film's soundtrack.
 The song is sung by Bob's Burgers character Teddy over the end credits of the episode "The Millie-churian Candidate", Season 5, episode 12.

References

1996 singles
1996 songs
Elektra Records singles
Music videos directed by Jake Scott (director)
Natalie Merchant songs
Songs written by Natalie Merchant
Warner Records singles